Mariane Goux Amaro (born 17 September 1993 in Montmorency) is a French-Portuguese football defender currently playing for VGA Saint-Maur in the French First Division. She is a member of the Portuguese national team.

References

1993 births
Living people
People from Montmorency, Val-d'Oise
Footballers from Val-d'Oise
French people of Portuguese descent
French women's footballers
Portuguese women's footballers
Paris Saint-Germain Féminine players
Portugal women's international footballers
Division 1 Féminine players
Women's association football fullbacks